El Adobe is a census-designated place in Kern County, California. The population was 391 at the 2020 census. El Adobe is 9 miles (14 km) south of Bakersfield.

References 

Census-designated places in Kern County, California

WikiProject Cities articles needing attention